Jüri Liim (born on 9 November 1940 in Tallinn) is a former Estonian politician, investigative journalist and track and field athlete (long-distance runner).

1965-1976 he won several medals at Estonian championships.

In 1990–1992 he was a member of parliament of Estonia (Ülemnõukogu) and Estonian Congress. He was one of the founders and leaders of Estonian Green Party (later Estonian Greens).

Awards
 2006: Order of the National Coat of Arms, III class.

References

Living people
1940 births
Estonian Greens politicians
Voters of the Estonian restoration of Independence
Estonian politicians
Estonian journalists
Estonian male long-distance runners
Recipients of the Order of the National Coat of Arms, 3rd Class
Politicians from Tallinn
Athletes from Tallinn